The 2019–20 Iona Gaels men's basketball team represented Iona College in the 2019–20 NCAA Division I men's basketball season. The Gaels were to be led by 10th-year head coach Tim Cluess, but he never coached a game due to health reasons. Associate head coach Tra Arnold took over the head coaching duties for this season. They played their home games at the Hynes Athletic Center in New Rochelle, New York as members of the Metro Atlantic Athletic Conference. They finished the season 12–17, 9–11 in MAAC play to finish in a tie for sixth place. As the No. 7 seed in the MAAC tournament, they defeated Canisius before losing to Saint Peter's in the quarterfinals.

Following the season, Cluess stepped down as head coach of the Gaels due to health concerns. A day later, the school named former Louisville coach Rick Pitino the Gaels' new head coach.

Previous season
The Gaels finished the 2018–19 season 17–16 overall, 12–6 in MAAC play to win the regular season championship. They defeated Saint Peter's, Siena, and Monmouth to win the MAAC tournament for a record fourth consecutive time. As a result, they received the MAAC's automatic bid to the NCAA tournament as the No. 16 seed in the Midwest region. There they lost to No. 1 seeded North Carolina in the first round 73–88, despite leading by 5 at halftime.

Roster

Schedule and results

|-
!colspan=12 style=| Exhibition

|-
!colspan=12 style=| Non-conference regular season

|-
!colspan=12 style=| MAAC regular season

|-
!colspan=12 style=| MAAC tournament
|-

|-

Source

References

Iona Gaels men's basketball seasons
Iona Gaels
Iona Gaels men's basketball
Iona Gaels men's basketball